The Flat Hachinohe is an arena in the city of Hachinohe, Aomori, Japan. It is used for ice hockey and figure skating and is the home arena of Tohoku Free Blades of the Asia League Ice Hockey.

References

External links
Official website

Basketball venues in Japan
Indoor ice hockey venues in Japan
Indoor arenas in Japan
Sports venues completed in 2020
Hachinohe
2020 establishments in Japan
Sports venues in Aomori Prefecture